The Water Company of Tonopah Building is a historic building located at the intersection of Burrough and Brougher Avenues in Tonopah, Nevada. Built in 1909, the building housed offices for the Water Company of Tonopah. Tonopah's first water service began in 1902, when three water companies each gained franchises to provide water to one district of the town. By 1905, Philadelphia businessman John Brock owned two of the water companies, which he consolidated into the Water Company of Tonopah. Brock also owned multiple mines in Tonopah and the local railroad. The Water Company of Tonopah Building is the only surviving building which belonged to one of Tonopah's early water companies.

The building was added to the National Register of Historic Places on May 20, 1982.

The Tonopah Volunteer Firehouse and Gymnasium is adjacent.

References

External links
 Water company

Tonopah, Nevada
Buildings and structures in Nye County, Nevada
Commercial buildings completed in 1909
Commercial buildings on the National Register of Historic Places in Nevada
National Register of Historic Places in Tonopah, Nevada
1909 establishments in Nevada